Guy Henri Georges "Guy-Pierre" Volpert (10 November 1916 – 26 December 2000) was a French ice hockey player. He competed in the men's tournament at the 1936 Winter Olympics.

References

1916 births
2000 deaths
Ice hockey players at the 1936 Winter Olympics
Olympic ice hockey players of France